Thermopsis villosa, or Aaron's rod, is an herbaceous plant in the legume family.  Its native range is in North America, in the southern Appalachian mountains. It is found elsewhere as an escape from cultivation.

References 

Sophoreae
Plants described in 1788